Turin is a hamlet in Alberta, Canada within the Lethbridge County.

Sharing its name with Turin, Italy, an Olympic flag was erected in the hamlet to coincide with the 2006 Winter Olympics.  It was founded in 1908 and named after the first settler's horse.

Demographics 

See also 
List of communities in Alberta
List of designated places in Alberta
List of hamlets in Alberta

References 

Designated places in Alberta
Hamlets in Alberta
Lethbridge County